Mark Christensen (born October 26, 1955) is an American former professional basketball player and coach. He led the Úrvalsdeild karla in scoring during the 1978–1979 season.

Early life
Christensen grew up in Kearney in Nebraska.

College career
Christensen attendted Kearney State College from 1971 to 1975 were he scored 1,070 points over four seasons. He spent the 1975–1976 season with Wilfrid Laurier University in Waterloo, Ontario where he was selected to OUAA Men's Basketball First Team All-Star.

Professional career
In 1977, Christensen was hired as a player-coach with Þór Akureyri. During his first season with Þór, he was the third leading scorer in the league with 363 points, averaging 25.9 points in 14 games. After finishing with a 4–10 record, Þór had to face Snæfell in two games for which team would play in the Úrvalsdeild karla the following season. Þór won both games with Christensen scoring 31 and 28 points in the outings.

In January 1979, Christensen was loaned to KR to participate international tournament in England, where it faced Cincinnati Oaks from the United States, Scottish champions Boroughmuir, and Team Ziebart, which went on to win the English National Basketball League that season. KR finished third in the tournament with Christensen averaging 25.3 points per game.

During his second season, he led the league in scoring with 600 points in 20 games. Despite his scoring prowess, Þór was relegated at the end of the season. Shortly later, Christensen signed with Úrvalsdeild club ÍR. In 20 games for ÍR, Christensen averaged 26.4 points per game.

Úrvalsdeild statistics

Coaching career
Christensen coached Þór Akureyri from 1977 to 1979, accumulating a 7–27 record. He served as an assistant coach to the Icelandic men's national basketball team during the 1980 Polar Cup championships.

References

External links
Úrvalsdeild statistics at Icelandic Basketball Association
Profile at Wilfrid Laurier University

1955 births
American men's basketball coaches
American men's basketball players
ÍR men's basketball players
Úrvalsdeild karla (basketball) coaches
Úrvalsdeild karla (basketball) players
Þór Akureyri men's basketball players
Living people
Centers (basketball)